A Secure Shell fingerprint record (abbreviated as SSHFP record) is a type of resource record in the Domain Name System (DNS) which identifies SSH keys that are associated with a host name. The acquisition of an SSHFP record needs to be secured with a mechanism such as DNSSEC for a chain of trust to be established.

Structure 

  The name of the object to which the resource record belongs (optional)
  Time to live (in seconds). Validity of Resource Records (optional)
  Protocol group to which the resource record belongs (optional) 
  Algorithm (0: reserved; 1: RSA; 2: DSA, 3: ECDSA; 4: Ed25519 6:Ed448;)
  Algorithm used to hash the public key (0: reserved; 1: SHA-1; 2: SHA-256)
  Hexadecimal representation of the hash result, as text

Example 

In this example, the host with the domain name host.example.com uses a DSA key with the SHA-1 fingerprint 123456789abcdef67890123456789abcdef67890.

With the OpenSSH suite, the ssh-keyscan utility can be used to determine the fingerprint of a host's key; using the -D will print out the SSHFP record directly.

See also 
 List of DNS record types

References

Internet Standards
Internet protocols
DNS record types
Key management
Secure Shell